The 1960–61 SK Rapid Wien season was the 63rd season in club history.

Squad

Squad and statistics

Squad statistics

Fixtures and results

League

Cup

European Cup

References

1960-61 Rapid Wien Season
Rapid